Ma femme s'appelle Maurice is a 2002 French comedy film directed by Jean-Marie Poiré and starring Alice Evans, Régis Laspalès, Philippe Chevallier and Götz Otto.

Cast
Régis Laspalès as Maurice Lappin
Philippe Chevallier as Georges Audefey
Alice Evans as  Emmanuelle
Götz Otto as Johnny Zucchini
Anémone as Claire Trouabal
Martin Lamotte as Jean-Bernard Trouabal
Virginie Lemoine as Marion Audefey
Guy Marchand as Charles Boisdain
Urbain Cancelier as Poilard
Stéphane Audran as Jacqueline Boisdain
Marco Bonini as Marcello
Jean-Pierre Castaldi as Le concessionnaire
Michèle Garcia as The seller
Sylvie Joly as The Orlyval woman
Raphaël Mezrahi as The man at the fashion show
Danièle Évenou as The baker
Paul Belmondo as The car seller 1
Benjamin Castaldi as The car seller 2

References

External links
 

2002 films
2000s French-language films
2002 comedy films
French comedy films
Films directed by Jean-Marie Poiré
2000s French films